The 2010 Fordham Rams football team represented Fordham University in the 2010 NCAA Division I FCS football season. The Rams were led by fifth year head coach Tom Masella and played their home games at Coffey Field. They are a member of the Patriot League.

Fordham welcomed its first class of scholarship players since the school flirted with elevating to the Division I-AA level in the late 1970s. The Rams were made ineligible for the Patriot League championship because the league's bylaws prohibited the use of scholarship players.

They finished the season 5–6, with a 3–3 record against Patriot League opponents. Because their games did not count in the league standings, the Patriot League record book credits them with a 0–0 record and places them last in the standings table.

Schedule

References

Fordham
Fordham Rams football seasons
Fordham Rams football